= Chinazes =

Ukrainian slang term

Chinazes (чіназес) is a Ukrainian youth-slang interjection used to express approval, pleasure, satisfaction, or the sense that something has turned out well.

In linguistic scholarship, the term has been listed among contemporary Ukrainian student-slang expressions used to convey emotional states and exclamations. A 2025 study of Ukrainian-language social-media discourse cited chinazes among youth-slang items that had moved beyond private online use into public posts and local media discourse.

== Usage ==
The term is used mainly in informal speech and online communication as a short evaluative reaction. In media explanations aimed at a general audience, it is presented as a positive slang response roughly comparable to awesome, cool, or that went well.

== Public attention ==
In Google's year-end review of search trends in Ukraine, the query "що таке чиназес" ("what is chinazes") ranked tenth among the country's fastest-rising "What is...?" searches for 2024. English-language coverage by The New Voice of Ukraine and Espreso Global also noted the term's appearance among notable Ukrainian search queries for the year.
